José Albano Ferreira da Mota (born 25 February 1964) is a Portuguese retired footballer who played mainly as a right-back, currently manager of S.C. Farense.

He spent most of his playing career with Paços de Ferreira, where he also began his coaching career and won two Segunda Liga titles. In two decades as a manager he led eight teams in Primeira Liga, and won the Taça de Portugal for Aves in 2018.

Football career

Playing career and first Paços stint
Mota was born in Paredes, Porto District. After humble beginnings with Aliados Lordelo F.C. in the outskirts of his birthplace, he went on to spend nearly a decade at F.C. Paços de Ferreira, often leading the club as its captain. After retiring, he immediately joined their coaching staff, being promoted to head manager in 2000. In 2003, he had a short stint with C.D. Santa Clara in the Azores, but returned to Paços shortly after.

In the 2006–07 season, Mota led Paços de Ferreira to the UEFA Cup for the first time after a sixth-place finish in the league. The northerners would subsequently lose in the first round of the European competition against AZ Alkmaar, 1–0 on aggregate.

Primeira Liga regular
In July 2008, Mota left Paços and joined Leixões S.C. also in the Primeira Liga. On 9 February 2010, with the Matosinhos team ranking second-bottom, he was sacked.

Mota returned to active in November 2010, being appointed at C.F. Os Belenenses who was struggling in the Segunda Liga and eventually narrowly avoided relegation. Between February 2012 and October of the following year, he coached Vitória F.C. in the top division.

On 2 September 2014, Mota was hired by Gil Vicente F.C. as a replacement to João de Deus, fired after three losses in as many top-flight games. On 25 March 2016, after a period of inactivity, he signed with second tier club C.D. Feirense, leading it to promotion after four years and being relieved of his duties in December of the same year.

Mota was appointed at C.D. Aves on 18 February 2017, achievement another promotion to the Portuguese top division but leaving subsequently by mutual consent. The 53-year-old moved abroad for the first time in late June, signing a two-year contract with CS Sfaxien from the Tunisian Ligue Professionnelle 1 and leading them to the quarter-finals of the CAF Confederation Cup.

Primeira return and Aves cup win
Mota returned to both Portugal and Aves on 24 January 2018, replacing the suspended Lito Vidigal as well as being appointed senior football and youth system coordinator. On 18 April, he took the club to its first-ever final of the Taça de Portugal after disposing of lowly Caldas S.C. 3–1 on aggregate, defeating Sporting CP 2–1 in the decisive match.

On 16 January 2019, Mota left Aves by mutual consent after their elimination from the quarter-finals of the cup by S.C. Braga. He returned to the league on 10 March at G.D. Chaves on a deal until 2020, and reiterated his commitment to the club after they were relegated on the last day of the season with a 5–2 defeat to C.D. Tondela; he managed his 400th game in Portugal's main tier on 21 April, a 2–2 draw against Belenenses SAD.

On 19 December 2019, with the team in eighth, Mota's contract was terminated and he was replaced by César Peixoto. Thirteen months later, he was back at work at 16th-placed Leixões, after over a decade away.

Mota returned to Paços for a third stint on 18 October 2022, after Peixoto was dismissed with the side 17th and no wins from nine matches. He left by mutual consent within two months, having lost all four league games and drawn two of three in the Taça da Liga.

Managerial statistics

Honours

Manager
Paços Ferreira
Segunda Liga: 1999–2000, 2004–05

Aves
Taça de Portugal: 2017–18

References

External links

1964 births
Living people
People from Paredes, Portugal
Sportspeople from Porto District
Portuguese footballers
Association football defenders
Primeira Liga players
Liga Portugal 2 players
Segunda Divisão players
F.C. Paços de Ferreira players
Portuguese football managers
Primeira Liga managers
Liga Portugal 2 managers
F.C. Paços de Ferreira managers
C.D. Santa Clara managers
Leixões S.C. managers
C.F. Os Belenenses managers
Vitória F.C. managers
Gil Vicente F.C. managers
C.D. Feirense managers
C.D. Aves managers
G.D. Chaves managers
S.C. Farense managers
Tunisian Ligue Professionnelle 1 managers
CS Sfaxien managers
Portuguese expatriate football managers
Expatriate football managers in Tunisia
Portuguese expatriate sportspeople in Tunisia